This article is the list of Korean FA Cup winners, including two predecessor competitions, All Joseon Football Tournament and Korean National Football Championship.

History 

The Korean first national football competition, All Joseon Football Tournament, was founded in 1921 by the Joseon Sports Council. It was held with several divisions according to age until 1940. The Korean college clubs also participated in the senior division from 1927 to 1931, because the college division was temporarily abolished during the time. The host of the Joseon Tournament was changed to the Joseon Football Association (currently KFA) since 1938 due to the disband of the Sports Council, and the tournament was eventually abolished by Japan. After the end of the Japanese occupation, the KFA founded the Korean National Football Championship, contested by semi-professional clubs and university clubs. Some semi-professional clubs converted as professional clubs after the foundation of the K League in 1983, and the KFA made an effort for participation of professional clubs in the National Championship at the time, but it was fulfilled in only two editions (1988 and 1989). The professional Korean FA Cup was founded separately in 1996, and the National Championship was merged into the FA Cup.

Qualified teams

All Joseon Football Tournament (1921–1940) 

 The first Korean national football tournament, All Joseon Football Tournament, was held by the Joseon Sports Council until 1937.
 The Joseon Football Association held it after the disband of the Joseon Sports Council.

Korean National Football Championship (1946–2000) 

 The Korean National Football Championship was a South Korean semi-professional football competition, held by the KFA. It is the predecessor competition of the current Korean FA Cup.

Korean FA Cup (1996–present) 

 The current South Korean FA Cup in which professional clubs also participate has been held since 1996.

Statistics

All-time (1921–present) 
 In South Korea, FA Cup era records are generally accepted. These all-time records are not mentioned generally.

Titles by club 
 Clubs shown in bold are K League clubs.
 The asterisk means co-winners, and the superscript "b" means B team's title.

FA Cup era (1996–present) 
 In accordance with the official K League policy, the current clubs inherit the history and records of the predecessor clubs.

Titles by club 

 Clubs shown in italics no longer exist.

Titles by city/province

Titles by region

See also
 Football in South Korea
 Korean FA Cup
 All Joseon Football Tournament
 Korean National Football Championship
 Korean President's Cup
 Korean League Cup
 List of South Korean football champions

References

External links
Official website
All Joseon Football Tournament at KFA
National Football Championship at KFA
FA Cup champions at KFA